Overblown may mean: 
a word related to exaggerated
"Overblown", a Mudhoney song on Singles: Original Motion Picture Soundtrack
Overblown (book), the book Overblown: How Politicians and the Terrorism Industry Inflate National Security Threats, and Why We Believe Them by American political scientist John E. Mueller

See also
Overblowing, changing a whistle or wind instrument's pitch by increasing air pressure